Rylski (Polish feminine: Rylska; plural: Rylscy) is a surname. Notable people with this surname include:

 Aleksander Ścibor-Rylski (1928–1983), Polish filmmaker
 Jacek Rylski (born 1956), Polish rower
 Zbigniew Ścibor-Rylski (1917–2018), Polish general

See also
 
 Rylsky (disambiguation)

Polish-language surnames